Erling Ramnefjell (born 1944) is a Norwegian journalist and editor. He worked with Dagbladet for nearly 37 years and held a variety of roles, including as news editor, deputy editor-in-chief and acting editor-in-chief.

Career
Ramnefjell served his conscription service as a journalist with Mannskapsavisa (now Forsvarets forum). He joined Dagbladet as a journalist in the early 1970s. Eventually he held a variety of management roles, including as news editor, deputy editor-in-chief and acting editor-in-chief. After 20 years in management he became a reporter and commentator again in 1995, and was one of the newspaper's most senior and well-known journalists. He retired from the newspaper in 2008. He is the father of Geir Ramnefjell, who is also an editor at Dagbladet.

References

Norwegian journalists
Dagbladet people
1944 births
Living people